The 6th European Men's and Women's Artistic Gymnastics Individual Championships was held from 15 to 19 April 2015 at the Park&Suites Arena in Montpellier, France. As usual in this format, no team competitions took place.

Schedule 
All times are in Central European Time (UTC+01:00).

Wednesday, 15 April 2015 
10:30 – 21:30 WAG Qualifying

Thursday, 16 April 2015 
10:30 – 21:00 MAG Qualifying

Friday, 17 April 2015
13:00 – 14:00 WAG All-Around Final
14:30 – 17:00 MAG All-Around Final

Saturday, 18 April 2015
14:30 – 17:30 Apparatus Finals Day 1

Sunday, 19 April 2015
14:30 – 17:30 Apparatus Finals Day 2

Venue 
The competition took place in the Park&Suites Arena. The training and warm up halls was in the same building. The arena hosted the 2011 World Rhythmic Gymnastics Championships.

Participating nations 
Each nation is allowed to send 6 men and 4 women. All nations that want to participate must be members of the European Union of Gymnastics. The following is based on the nominative roster.

  (7)
  (5)
  (8)
  (6)
  (7)
  (5)
  (6)
  (4)
  (6)
  (8)
  (8)
  (10)
  (10)
  (3)
  (10)
  (10)
  (8)
  (8)
  (8)
  (8)
  (10)
  (8)
  (6)
  (1)
  (1)
  (10)
  (7)
  (5)
  (4)
  (10)
  (10)
  (8)
  (10)
  (10)
  (2)
  (7)
  (9)
  (8)

Medalists

Women's results

Individual All-around 

Adlerteg was injured performing her floor routine and was unable to continue competition.

Vault

Uneven bars

Balance beam

Floor

Men's results

Individual All-around

Floor

Pommel horse

Rings

Vault

Parallel bars

Horizontal bar

Qualification results

Women's results

Individual All-around

Vanessa Ferrari withdrew and was replaced by teammate Martina Rizzelli in the final.

Vault

Uneven bars

Balance beam

Floor

Men's results

Individual All-around

Medal count

Total

Women

Men

References

External links 

  Official Site

European Artistic Gymnastics Championships
Gymnastics
2015 in French women's sport
International gymnastics competitions hosted by France
European Artistic Gymnastics Championships